Foel Wen is a subsidiary summit of Cadair Berwyn in north east Wales. It is one of the summits found on the most easterly of Cadair Berwyn's long south ridges.

The summit is grassy, and the entire face of Craig Berwyn can be viewed. To the north lies Tomle, while to the south lies its south top and Mynydd Tarw.

References

External links
www.geograph.co.uk : photos of Cadair Berwyn and surrounding area

Hewitts of Wales
Mountains and hills of Denbighshire
Nuttalls
Landforms of Powys